Rubus adenophorus is a species of deciduous shrub in the genus Rubus in the family Rosaceae native to China, where it was discovered in 1907. It is distinctive for its black-headed glands mixed with bristles on the stems.

Description

Height and spread: Reaches to 2.4m or more in height.
Stems: Arching stems are biennial and are densely clothed with bristles and stalked glands.
Leaves: 'Virgin' (first-year) shoots are mostly pinnate with five leaflets, which range from 5–13 cm in length, while on fertile shoots leaflets are in threes or smaller. Leaves are ovate to obovate, tapered to chordate at the base, dull-coloured and hairy both above and beneath.
Flowers: Small, pink flowers are borne in cylindrical panicles 10–13 cm in length. Flowers in July.
Fruit: Edible, black, sweet, conical fruit to about 1.3 cm in length.

Etymology
Rubus is the ancient Latin name meaning 'brambles' or 'bramble-like', while adenophorus is derived from the Greek for 'gland-bearing' (ἀδήν adēn, ‘gland’; φέρω pherō, ‘I bear’).

References

External links
 

adenophorus